Muerte, Spanish for death, may refer to:

Music
 La Muerte (Gorefest album), 2005
 Muerte, an album by Canserbero, 2012
 Muerte, an album by Will Haven, 2018

People
 Arturo Beltrán Leyva (1961–2009), "La Muerte", Mexican drug trafficker
 Leon del Muerte (born 1977), American guitarist and vocalist

Religion
 Santa Muerte, Mesoamerican religious figure
 San La Muerte, South American religious figure

See also 
 Muerto (disambiguation)
 Viva la Muerte (disambiguation)